Green Monkey Records is an underground record label started in Seattle, Washington, US. It was established by local musician Tom Dyer and was active from 1983 to 1991 and from 2009 to present, with sporadic releases in the interim. It is currently headquartered in Olympia, Washington, US.

History 
Green Monkey Records was established in 1983 by local musician Tom Dyer, who was inspired to begin recording and producing music after a recording session at Seattle's Triangle Studios. Using a "Teac four-track reel-to-reel and a Tapco 6200B mixer from a guy in a parking garage downtown,"  Dyer began recording and mixing music in his apartment in Seattle's Fremont neighborhood. Early clients included Mr. Epp and the Calculations, featuring Mark Arm (later of Mudhoney fame). After Dyer's landlord found out, the operation was quickly moved to the basement of a rented house on the north side of Seattle's Queen Anne Hill.

Between 1983 and 1991, Green Monkey Records released 44 albums. The label's biggest brush with commercial success came from the Green Pajamas' album "Book of Hours," a followup to the single "Kim the Waitress"  that was two years in the making. The label's had reached its heyday by 1987, and by 1988, changing priorities (including the birth of Dyer's first child) and new responsibilities (teaching at the Art Institute of Seattle) had begun to impact the label. In 1991, Dyer sold the majority of his recording equipment and closed the studio, although he did occasionally release new material, such as the Green Pajamas' Caroler's Song EP.

Sound and cultural impact 
Although Green Monkey Records has never enjoyed significant commercial success, the label does have a cult following. The label's sound has been categorized as "post-punk/pre-grunge Seattle"  and "indy pop music—good honest, ballsy, delicate, garage-y, punky, folky, mildly trippy pop music". The label has received positive press from local "listener-powered" indie radio station KEXP  as well as a number of indie music bloggers.

Revival 
In 2009, Green Monkey Records released a 2 CD compilation album, titled "It Crawled from the Basement: the green monkey records anthology." The album featured 47 tracks by 32 artists. To celebrate, Dyer orchestrated a release party at the SoDo Showbox featuring nine bands: The Green Pajamas, The Icons, The Purdins, Capping Day, The Queen Annes, Prudence Dredge, Liquid Generation, The Elements and Slam Suzanne. Inspired by positive press, Dyer began releasing more material, including several reissues, but notably new material and new artists as well. As of December 2016, the label has released 52 more albums, with a significant number of contributions by Dyer or Jeff Kelly and the Green Pajamas.

Christmas albums 
Since 2010, the label has released an annual Christmas compilation to benefit the charity MusiCares. Contributors include Green Monkey veterans such as The Green Pajamas, The Queen Annes, and Eric Padget (of Sigourney Reverb), as well as other artists from around the country, and of course, Dyer himself. Critical reception of the albums has been favorable, with Stubby's House of Christmas declaring that "somehow, every GD year, Green Monkey puts out one of the best Christmas albums of the year."

Move to Olympia 
In 2016, Dyer moved the label to the Capitol, Olympia, with some Olympia artists being added to the label's primarily Seattle mix. The natural result of this move can be seen in 2022 with Dyer's "Olympia: A True Story”, a 3-CD box set about the history of Olympia.

Discography 

1983

Various Artists - Local Product

Tom Dyer - Truth or Consequences

1984

Me Three - No Money ... No Fun

Tom Dyer - I Lived Three Lives

Bombardiers - Fight Back

1985

Prudence Dredge - Don't Stomp Away/Problem Child (single)

Jeff Kelly - Baroquen Hearts

Liquid Generation - I Love You/1/4 To Zen (single)

The Green Pajamas - Summer of Lust

The Elements - Honest Enough

1986

Various Artists - Monkey Business

Green Pajamas - Kim the Waitress/Jennifer (single)

The Queen Annes - Something Quick

The Fall-outs - The Fall-outs

Keith Livingston - i've got this room

The Icons - Masters of Disaster

The Icons - Live At The Hall of Fame

1987

Prudence Dredge - Big Ellen

Green Pajamas - Book of Hours

Jeff Kelly - Coffee in Nepal

Bruce Haedt - Miss Lyons Looking Sideways

The Life - Alone

Glass Penguins - raspberry

The Elements - ART

1988

Rich Hinklin - Contradiction

Green Pajamas - November

1989

Green Pajamas - Sister Anne/Emily Grace (single)

The Purdins - Let's Be Friends (EP)

Capping Day - Mona Lisa/Slow Fade (single)

Jon Strongbow - A Normal Sort of Guy

Jon Strongbow - Something Different

The Hitmen - Perfect Pain/Tiger Carpet (single)

1990

Green Pajamas - Ghosts of Love

Jeff Kelly - Portugal

The Hitmen - Smashface

The Life - Do It Again/A Broken Man (single)

Mad Mad Nomad - Keeper of the Cage/ Double Edged Dreamer (single)

Swelter Cacklebush - Swelter Cackle Bush (EP)

1991

Slam Suzzanne - On The Floor With Your Mom

Mad Mad Nomad - Snap Out

Joe Leonard - Breath

1992

Jeff Kelly - Private Electrical Storm

1995

Jeff Kelly - Ash Wednesday Rain

2001

The Green Pajamas - The Carolers’ Song

2009

Various Artists - It Crawled From the Basement 2

Tom Dyer – Songs from Academia Vol. 1: Singing

Various Artists - Santa's Not Dead: It's a Green Monkey Christmas!

2010

Tom Dyer – Songs from Academia Vol. 2: Instrumental & Spoken Word.

Green Pajamas - The Complete Book of Hours (remaster)

The Icons - Masters of Disaster (remix)

Green Pajamas - Red Red Rose (single)

The Hitmen - Smashface (remastered)

Various Artists - Hot Dog! It's Another Green Monkey Xmas!

2011

The Icons - Appointment With Destiny!

Green Pajamas - Green Pajama Country

Sigourney Reverb - Bees In Your Bed Bad

Various Artists - It Crawled Down the Chimney: It's Another GMR Xmas!

2012

The Life - Alone (remaster)

Goblin Market - Far Beneath Gondal's Foreign Sky

The Green Pajamas - Summer of Lust (remaster)

The Green Pajamas - Death By Misadventure

Tom Dyer - I Ain't Blue Any More

Various Artists - Frothing the Nog: Ye Fourth Green Monkey Xmas

2013

Jim of Seattle - We Are All Famous

The Colorplates – Agony and Ecstasy Post-Punk Art Rock Seattle 1979 -1982

King County Queens - Ladies and Gentlemen, Your King County Queens

The OF - Oh It's The OF

Gary Minkler - Little Trailer Ruby

The Green Pajamas - November (remix)

Various Artists - Green Monkey Records Presents Merry Krampus

Tom Dyer - Xmas - 30 Years In The Making

2014
The Queen Annes - Something Quick 1980-1985 (remaster)

Slam Suzanne - On The Floor With Your Mom (remaster)

Jeff and Susanne Kelly - By Reckless Moonlight

Green Pajamas - Happy Halloween!

Tom Dyer - Xmas-30 Years In The Making

2015

Me Three - No Money No Fun (remix)

The OF - Escape Goat

Jim McIver - Sunlight Reaches

Tom Dyer's New Pagan Gods - History Of Northwest Rock Vol. 1, 1959-1968

Fur For Fairies - Fur For Fairies

The Fuzz - Best Kept Secret

Fur For Fairies - I Didn't Know (Single)

Various - Christmas Monkey On My Back

2016

Liquid Generation - Quarter to Zen

The Navins - Not Yourself Today

Fur For Fairies - I Breathe You In (Single)

Tom Dyer - Meditations on Prince Bowie (Single)

The Queen Annes - Released!

The Green Pajamas - If You Knew What I Dreamed

The Green Pajamas - To The End Of The Sea

Tom Dyer's New Pagan Gods - Tom Dyer's New Pagan Gods Play Hendrix

Jim of Seattle - Both the Planet Frank and the Chet Lambert Show

Burnseer - Burnseer

The Freewheelin' Joe Ross - Post-Election Day Blues (Single)

Various - All I Want For Xmas: GMR Xmas VII

2017

Tom Dyer – Songs To Annoy Small Children

AAIIEE – folly

The Shaken Growlers

Dante and Eros Faulk – Beirt

Swedish Finnish -Swedish Finnish

The Green Pajamas – Supernatural Afternoon

Tom Dyer and the True Olympians – Christmas in Olympia (Single)

Various - The Good, The Bad, and Other Christmas Favorites!
 
2018

The Green Pajamas – Phantom Lake: Northern Gothic 3

Brain Wizard – Brain Wizard's Most Hella Dopest

Tom Dyer & The True Olympians – 12 New Recordings

REDS Band - REDS Band

Wenis - The Donut House, Seattle 1980

Various - A Green Monkey Christmas For Martians Up On Mars

Tom & Kat's Excellent Christmas Adventure
 
2019

Maggie Teachout – Maybe I'm Still Just Peter

My Favorite Martian – The Martian Chronicles, Los Angeles 1990's

Jeff Kelly – Beneath The Stars, Above The River

Al Bloch's Summer of Fun Super Party Mix Tape

Tom Dyer – 1+1 = ?

Sally Barry – Renditions

Chemistry Set – The Incomplete Fabulous Stinking Chemistry Set

Toiling Midgets – Sea of Tranquility

Richard Peterson Orchestra – Seven

Kline's 57 – Joaquin Wounded

Various - Hail The Jolly Christmas Monkey!
 
2020

Joe Cason & Bob Hart – Notes From Sea Level

Zelda Starfire – V8 (EP)

Olivia Bloch – Georgy Girl (Single)

Tom Dyer – Truth or Consequences

Dante and Eros Faulk – Mirage

Al Bloch – It Was All Once Bright Jewels

Jeff Kelly – When The World Was Younger

Raymond C. Mobley – Breathe

Band of Certainty – Twist and Sway (Seven Songs)

Jon Strongbow – Alien City

Tom Dyer – Beautimus and other sounds of the Nineties

Al Bloch – Protest Songs

Tom Dyer & The True Olympians - Pandemic Christmas (Single)

Various - Pandemic Christmas
 
2021

Richard Peterson Catalog

Richard Peterson's First Album

Richard Peterson -The Second Album

Richard Peterson - Love On The Golf Course

Richard Peterson - The William Loose Songbook

Richard Peterson - Richard's Ungreatest Hits

Richard Peterson -The Religious Album

Richard Peterson - Mathisization

Richard Peterson - Topaz Single

Steve Trettevik – Faded Champion

The Deans – Live December 31, 1981, 66 Bell

Jon Strongbow – Something Different

Glass Penguins – raspberry

James and the Giant Peach

Al Bloch – Kinda Makes Me Smile

Mud Shack - Mud Shack

The Green Pajamas – Sunlight Might Weigh Even More

Throttle Body M/C – Super Hits Of The ’70s

Village Green - Village Green

The True Olympians – Holiday Collection
 
2022

Jon Strongbow – What It Takes

The Holidays – Big Sexy World!

The Green Pajamas – Forever For A Little While

Tom Dyer & The True Olympians – Olympia: A True Story

References

External links 
official website

American record labels